Yedey is the name of several rural localities in the Sakha Republic, Russia:
Yedey, Khangalassky District, Sakha Republic, a selo in Malzhagarsky 4-y Rural Okrug of Khangalassky District
Yedey, Nyurbinsky District, Sakha Republic, a selo in Yedeysky Rural Okrug of Nyurbinsky District